Shannon Keith is an American animal rights lawyer, activist, and documentary director/producer. She is the director of the Animal Liberation Front documentary, Behind the Mask: The Story Of The People Who Risk Everything To Save Animals.

Background
Keith grew up in Los Angeles, California, with a house full of animals. Ever since she was a small child, Shannon rescued injured and homeless animals and nursed them back to health or placed them in loving homes.

In later life, Keith became an animal rights activist, documentary film maker and animal rights lawyer. Animals are considered property, and she has striven to change that fact while defending animal rights activists in the courtroom, saving dogs condemned to death in Los Angeles, as well as litigating against those who abuse animals.

Keith has represented a number of well-known animal-rights activists and campaigns, including Stop Huntingdon Animal Cruelty (SHAC) and Kevin Kjonaas, the former president of SHAC USA, against Huntingdon Life Sciences, and the Sea Shepherd Conservation Society.

She has saved dogs from being euthanized in Los Angeles, and in 2000, she obtained the largest settlement against the City of Los Angeles for the beating to death of a dog by a city employee.

Circa 2002, Shannon began to challenge the media with her strong message in support of animal liberation actions and activists.

In 2004, Shannon started a non-profit, tax-exempt group called ARME (Animal rescue media education). ARME rescues homeless animals and focuses on stopping the problem at its roots through educational initiatives, including making documentaries about animals and animal activists.

In 2006, after three years of filming, Keith released a documentary film about the Animal Liberation Front entitled Behind the Mask: The Story Of The People Who Risk Everything To Save Animals. The documentary was produced in response to what the ALF sees as a growing bias within the mainstream media towards the animal rights movement, both above and underground. Keith founded and runs Uncaged Films /ARME (Animal Rescue, Media & Education), which produced the documentary.

Beagle Freedom Project

Shannon Keith founded Beagle Freedom Project and its predecessor companies. Founded in 2004 as "ARME (Animal Rescue, Media & Education)", in 2018 it changed its name to "Rescue + Freedom Project" with Kevin Kjonaas as secretary, and in 2019 was changed to "Beagle Freedom Project". Kevin Kjonaas, also known as Kevin Jonas and Kevin Chase of SHAC 7 fame, is the Vice President of the project.

See also
 List of animal rights advocates

References

Living people
Year of birth missing (living people)
American lawyers
American documentary filmmakers
American women lawyers
Animal lawyers
American animal rights activists
American women documentary filmmakers
21st-century American women